One Song may refer to:

"One Song", a song from the 1937 Disney film soundtrack Snow White and the Seven Dwarfs
"One Song" (Tevin Campbell song), a 1991 song by Tevin Campbell
"One Song" (Prince song), a 1999 song by Prince 
"One Song" (Envy song), a 2013 song by Norwegian duo Envy
"One Song" (Archie Roach song), a 2022 song by Australian artist, Archie Roach

See also
One More Song, the second album by Randy Meisner
One Song at a Time, an album by Jamie Grace
"One Song for You", a song by Sleater-Kinney from their 1999 album The Hot Rock
 One (song) (disambiguation)